Nutritional biodiversity is a diet that focuses on the diversity of an organism's nutritional consumption or intake. Some believe this diversity directly relates to the overall health and vitality of the organism — human or animal.

Nutritional Diversity or Nutritional Biodiversity, is a diet studied in Panama by an athlete and permaculturist named Brandon Eisler. He has been studying and testing diverse nutritional intake in the range of 50 to 200 different species, not mono-culture derived, and the effects of this on both athletic performance and healing the sick.

Although traditional diets emphasize a sufficient intake of fruit and vegetables, they do not emphasize the range or variety of this intake. Nutritional biodiversity encourages the consumption of about 10 – 15 different green vegetables over a period of a fortnight, rather than the same green vegetable every day for that same period. This extends to all types of fruits and vegetables.

Different fruits and vegetables provide different vitamins and minerals and in differing quantities, and it is this diversity that is essential to ensure that all nutritional needs are met. Every other species of mammal, in the wild, takes in a much larger spectrum of nutrition that humans. The diet realizes also that domestication of food species and humans, is the root of many health problems.

In the book Back from the Brink, an example is used of the various bloodlines of race horses in the UK and USA. What the author found is that when horses grazed in fields that did not have weeds and had other non-grassy plants removed (hence a lower level of biodiversity), these bloodlines appeared to under-perform when compared to those that had been allowed to graze from fields in which other plants and weeds were allowed to grow freely.

References

 https://nutritionaldiversity.com/

Diets